School District 75 Mission is a school district in the Central Fraser Valley of British Columbia . Centered in Mission, immediately north of Abbotsford, British Columbia, it extends eastward beyond that municipality along the north side of the Fraser River as far as Lake Errock and Deroche.

Schools

See also
List of school districts in British Columbia

External links
 Mission Public School District

75
Mission, British Columbia